Caenispirillum is a bacterial genus from the family of Rhodospirillaceae.

References

Further reading 
 
 
 
 

 

Rhodospirillales
Bacteria genera